Antonio Karmona Herrera (born 24 March 1968) is a Spanish former professional footballer who played as a defender.

He was best known for his Alavés stint, where he played seven full seasons and in 260 competitive matches, also being the undisputed team captain.

Most of Karmona's career was spent, however, in Segunda División, where he amassed totals of 260 games and 11 goals over the course of eight seasons, representing three clubs including his main one.

Club career
Karmona was born in Bermeo, Basque Country. At the age of 22, he was playing amateur football in his hometown and preparing to become a fisherman like his father and many others from the town, but instead was invited to join the senior ranks of local Sestao Sport Club.

Karmona played in the second division with Sestao for the first three seasons out of five he spent with the team from the 'left bank' – they were relegated in 1993 and promoted back in 1995, amidst financial problems which would soon see them dissolved and refounded in the lower leagues. By then he had moved on to SD Eibar, where he spent one year before moving to another club from the same region and level, Deportivo Alavés; in his second season with the latter, he contributed with 40 appearances (3,600 minutes, with three goals) as they returned to La Liga after an absence of more than 40 years.

Having played in all 38 league matches during the 1998–99 campaign, Karmona captained Alavés to the 2000–01 final of the UEFA Cup, where they met Liverpool and eventually lost 4–5 due to an own golden goal by Delfí Geli, with him being sent off during extra time. In an interview before the game, he revealed he was a lifelong Liverpool fan.

After suffering relegation, 35-year-old Karmona re-joined Eibar and played two more division two seasons before retiring. Subsequently, he worked with Athletic Bilbao's coaching and scouting staff for some time.

International career
Karmona won five caps for the Basque Country unofficial representative team. In 2003, his last appearance, he became the first Eibar player to be selected.

References

External links

1968 births
Living people
Spanish footballers
Footballers from the Basque Country (autonomous community)
Association football defenders
La Liga players
Segunda División players
Segunda División B players
Sestao Sport Club footballers
SD Eibar footballers
Deportivo Alavés players
Basque Country international footballers
Athletic Bilbao non-playing staff
People from Bermeo
Bermeo FT footballers
Sportspeople from Biscay